Cracker Jack is an unincorporated community in Carroll Township, Washington County, Pennsylvania, United States.

References

Unincorporated communities in Washington County, Pennsylvania
Unincorporated communities in Pennsylvania